Latoue is a village and commune in the Haute-Garonne department in southwestern France. It is best known for the castle which dominates the village.

Population

Sights
The Château de Latoue is a castle first built in the 12th century, with major additions and alterations in the 13th, 16th and 18th centuries. Privately owned, it has been listed in 1979 as a historic site by the French Ministry of Culture.

See also
Communes of the Haute-Garonne department

References

Communes of Haute-Garonne